Aluru Seelin Kiran Kumar (born 22 Oct 1952) is an Indian space scientist and former chairman of the Indian Space Research Organisation, having assumed office on 14 January 2015. He is credited with the development of key scientific instruments aboard the Chandrayaan-1 and Mangalyaan space crafts. In 2014, he was awarded the Padma Shri, India's fourth highest civilian award, for his contributions to the fields of science and technology. Kiran Kumar previously served as Director of Ahmedabad Space Applications Centre.

Biography

Kiran Kumar Aluru Seelin was born in a Hindu family in Hassan District in 1952, in the Indian state of Karnataka. He graduated in Physics (Honours). In 1971, from the National College of Bangalore University. This was followed by a degree of MSc in Electronics from the same university, in 1973. His further studies were at the Indian Institute of Science, Bangalore from where he passed MTech in Physical Engineering, in 1975.

Kiran Kumar started his career, joining Space Applications Centre, Ahmedabad, in 1975, working on Space borne Electro -optical imaging instruments. He has remained at the institution ever since and is the Director of the Electro-optical Systems Group since April 2012. He also served as the chairman of ISRO from Jan 2015 to Jan 2018. He has represented Indian Space Research Organization at many international forums such as the World Meteorological Organisation and Indo-US Joint Working Group on Civil Space Cooperation and holds the Chair of the ISRO at the Committee on Earth Observation Satellites (CEO).

Legacy
Kiran Kumar's legacy spans across his contributions to the scientific world, specifically Indian space endeavors, and his efforts towards the dissemination of knowledge by way of articles and lectures.

Scientific contributions
Kiran Kumar is known to have made contributions to the Indian space programmes, from the early projects like Bhaskara TV payload till the later programmes such as Chandrayaan-1 and Mangalyaan. Kumar is credited with the design and development of the electro-optical image sensors used in India's first remote sensing satellite, Bhaskara, launched in 1979 and the subsequent one in 1981, as well as the ocean colour instruments used in weather forecasting, sea zone/landscape mapping and telecommunications.

He is also reported to have contributed to the design and development of the imaging instruments for projects such as INSAT–3D, Resourcesat, Micro Satellite and Cartosat.
 The Terrain Mapping Camera and Hyperspectral Imager payloads of Chandrayaan-1 project is also credited to the efforts of Kiran Kumar. It was the group led by Kumar which developed three of the five scientific instruments

Academic contributions
Kumar has attended many seminars and conferences where he has delivered lectures and keynote addresses. He has also published several articles in peer reviewed international journals, ResearchGate has listed 41 of his articles.

Awards and recognitions

Kiran Kumar has received many awards and honors, starting with the Indian Society of Remote Sensing Award in 1994. Four years later, in 1998, he received the Vasvik award, followed by the Astronautical Society of India Award in 2001. The Indian Space Research Organization honoured Kumar with the Individual Service award in 2006 and the Bhaskara Award of the Indian Society of Remote Sensing came his way in 2007. The next year, 2008, saw Kumar getting the Team Achievement Award 2008 of International Academy of Astronautics and the ISRO Performance Award from the Indian Space Research Organization.

 Kiran Kumar has been conferred with the fellowship by the National Academy of Engineers and is a corresponding member of the International Academy of Astronautics. The Government of India honored Kiran Kumar Alur Seelin with the Padma Shri by including him in the 2014 Republic Day Honours. Kiran Kumar was awarded the Honorary Doctorate Degree from GITAM University on 24 March 2015.
He is the Chairman of Bangalore Association for Science Education (BASE) which administers the premier institute Jawaharlal Nehru Planetarium, Bengaluru.

 In 2017 he was awarded the Vijnan Ratna H K Firodia award for his direction of the Indian space programme in such areas as earth observations, communication, navigation and developed indigenous launch vehicles.

 In 2019 France's highest civilian award - Chevalier de l'Ordre national de la Lgion d'Honneur - for his contribution to India-France space cooperation.
 Shri A.S. Kiran Kumar is the President-Elect of The Aeronautical Society of India.

See also

 Space Applications Centre
 Mars Orbiter Mission
 Indian Space Research Organization
 Chandrayaan-1

References

Further reading

External links
   

 

1952 births
Living people
Recipients of the Padma Shri in science & engineering
Scientists from Karnataka
People from Hassan district
Indian Space Research Organisation people
Indian Institute of Science alumni
Indian space scientists
Bangalore University alumni
Indian aerospace engineers
Engineers from Karnataka
20th-century Indian engineers
Recipients of the Rajyotsava Award 2015